The Kyma was an English automobile manufactured from 1903 to 1905.

History 
Built by the New Kyma Car Company of Peckham, it came in  twin-cylinder models of three and four wheels.

See also 
 List of car manufacturers of the United Kingdom

References
David Burgess Wise, The New Illustrated Encyclopedia of Automobiles

Defunct motor vehicle manufacturers of England
Defunct companies based in London
Veteran vehicles